The 1989 Los Angeles Raiders season was the franchise's 30th season overall, and the franchise's 20th season in the National Football League.  Art Shell replaced Mike Shanahan, and in the process became the first black head coach in the NFL since Fritz Pollard coached the Akron Pros in 1921. The team finished with an 8–8 record. In preseason against the Houston Oilers, the Raiders played their first game in Oakland since moving to Los Angeles in 1982, before eventually moving back to Oakland in 1995.

Offseason

NFL draft

Transactions
NFL Plan B Free Agent signings
Bob Golic

Staff

Roster

Regular season
The Raiders started the season with one win and three losses. After hiring Art Shell in Week 5, the Raiders won seven of their next ten games. The Raiders suffered road losses to the Seahawks and to the Giants, to be eliminated from playoff contention.

Against the Cincinnati Bengals, Bo Jackson scored a touchdown on a 92-yard run. He became the first player ever with two runs of 90 plus yards in a career. Steve Wisniewski was the youngest player on the Raiders roster. At the age of 22, he was in the starting lineup at the Guard position. Steve Beuerlein started seven games at quarterback and his best performance was against the New York Giants in week 16. Beuerlein had 16 completions and 266 passing yards.

Schedule

Game summaries

Week 5

Week 6

Standings

Awards and records
 Mike Dyal, AFC Offensive Player of Week 13 (caught 4 passes for 134 yards and 1 TD vs. Denver, caught 67 yard pass to send game into Overtime, caught 2 passes for 41 yards to set up game-winning field goal.)
 Howie Long, AFC Pro Bowl selection

References

External links
 1989 Los Angeles Raiders at Pro-Football-Reference.com

Los Angeles Raiders
Los Angeles Raiders seasons
Los